Signe Scheel (1860–1942) was a Norwegian painter.

Biography
Scheel was born 23 November 1860 in Hamar. She studied with Christian Krohg in Norway, with Karl Gussow in Berlin, Germany, and with Pascal Dagnan-Bouveret at the Académie Colarossi in Paris, France.

Scheel exhibited frequently at the Høstutstillingen. Her most famous work, The Lord's Servant, is in the National Museum of Art in Oslo.

Scheel died 15 December 1942 in Oslo.

Legacy
In 2017, the Signe Scheel Hall was established at Skrivergarden Undesløs, where Scheel lived from 1877 to 1898.

Gallery

References

External links
 images of Signe Scheel's paintings on artNET
 images of Signe Scheel's drawings at the Nasjonalmuseet, The Fine Art Collections

1860 births
1942 deaths
Norwegian women painters
19th-century Norwegian women artists
20th-century Norwegian women artists
19th-century Norwegian painters
20th-century Norwegian painters
People from Hamar